Issers is a town and commune in Algeria.

It may also refer to: 
 Issers District, a district in Algeria.
 Issers River, a river in Algeria.
 First Battle of the Issers (1837), a battle during the French conquest of Algeria.
 Issers bombing (2008), a terrorist attack in Algeria.